Ewyas Harold is a village and civil parish in the Golden Valley in Herefordshire, England, near the Wales-England border about halfway between Abergavenny, Monmouthshire, and Hereford. The population of this civil parish at the 2011 census was 883. It lies on the Dulas brook, and is contiguous with the neighbouring village of Pontrilas.

The village is on the site of Ewyas Harold Castle, of which only the motte remains. Its name derives from the Welsh kingdom of Ewyas and Harold, son of Ralph the Timid (Earl of Hereford), and grandson of King Æthelred the Unready.

Ewyas Harold  parish has a large area of common land rich in wildlife and ancient  meadow saffron, a leftover from cultivation by the monks at Dore Abbey. Some villagers have commoner's rights.

The village has a school, a fire station and a redundant Catholic church. The Church of England ministry of St. Michael and All Angels is now linked with that of several neighbouring parishes. It is the nearest village to the Pontrilas Army Training Area.

References

Sources
Bannister, Arthur Thomas, The history of Ewias Harold, its castle, priory, and church (Hereford 1902)

External links
Ewyas Harold Castle, castle and priory excavations
Ewyas Harold parish plan from 2005
St Michael & All Angels, Ewyas Harold - with Dulas, diocesan website
Ewyas Harold Group Parish Council

Villages in Herefordshire